Oenosandra is a monotypic moth genus in the family Oenosandridae. Its only species, Oenosandra boisduvalii, or Boisduval's autumn moth, is found in the southern half of Australia, including Tasmania. Both the genus and species were first described by Edward Newman in 1856.

The wingspan is about 50 mm.

The larvae feed on Eucalyptus species.

References

Oenosandridae
Taxa named by Edward Newman